Wu Xiaojun (born January 1966) is a Chinese politician and the current governor of Qinghai, in office since 2022.

Early life and education 
Wu was born in Taihe County, Jiangxi, in January 1966. In 1984, he entered Jiangxi University, majoring in political economics.

Career in Jiangxi 
He joined the Chinese Communist Party (CCP) in May 1986, and got involved in politics in July 1988, when he was assigned to Jiangxi Economic Information Center as an official. Beginning in May 1994, he served in several posts in the General Office of Jiangxi Provincial People's Government, including section member, secretary, and deputy director. He was appointed vice mayor of Yingtan in August 2006 and was admitted to member of the standing committee of the CCP Yingtan Municipal Committee, the province's top authority. In June 2010, he became deputy director of Jiangxi Provincial Development and Reform Commission, rising to director in October 2014. He was promoted to be vice governor of Jiangxi in March 2017, and two years later was promoted to member of the standing committee of the CCP Jiangxi Provincial Committee, the province's top authority. In March 2020, he was appointed party secretary of the capital Nanchang, the top political position in the city.

Career in Qinghai 
In April 2021, he was transferred to northwest China's Qinghai province and appointed deputy party secretary, concurrently serving as party branch secretary of Qinghai since March 2022. On March 31, he was named acting governor of Qinghai, succeeding Xin Changxing.

References

1966 births
Living people
People from Taihe County, Jiangxi
Nanchang University alumni
Jiangxi University of Finance and Economics alumni
People's Republic of China politicians from Jiangxi
Chinese Communist Party politicians from Jiangxi